Adam Levin (b. 1976/77) is an American fiction author. His short fiction has been published in places like Timothy McSweeney's Quarterly Concern and Tin House. Currently, he resides in Chicago, where he teaches Creative Writing and Literature at the School of the Art Institute. His first novel, The Instructions, was published in 2010 by McSweeney's.

Works

The Instructions
Levin's first novel, The Instructions, was selected by Powell's Indispensable Book Club and The Rumpus Book Club.

Some reviews drew comparisons with David Foster Wallace and Philip Roth. Some reviewers praised the dark humor, the depth of the setting, and the commentary on Jewish identity. Some reviewers criticized the book's length (more than 1000 pages), while others praised it.

The Instructions was translated into French (Inculte) and published in France in 2011.

Hot Pink
Levin's Hot Pink is a collection of short stories released in 2012.

Bubblegum
Levin's second novel, Bubblegum, was released on April 14, 2020.

Mount Chicago
Mount Chicago, ‎ Doubleday (August 9, 2022), 592 pages,

References

External links
 Levin's website

Living people
21st-century American male writers
Place of birth missing (living people)
1970s births
American male novelists
American male short story writers
Writers from Chicago
Year of birth missing (living people)